Allen M. Potter (September 5, 1919 –  June 5, 1995) was an American television soap opera producer. His longest tenure as Executive Producers for daytime series was for The Doctors and Guiding Light. He was GL's head writer during the 1981 WGA strike.

Positions held
Another World
Executive Producer (1964-1966; 1983-1984)

As the World Turns
Producer

The Doctors
 Executive Producer (1967-1973)

Guiding Light
Executive Producer (1976-1982)
Head writer (1981)

Our Private World
Producer

Awards and nominations
Daytime Emmy Award
Win, 1980, 1982, Drama Series, Guiding Light

Primetime Emmy Award
Nomination, 1973, Drama Series, The Doctors
Win, 1972, Drama Series, The Doctors

External links

Soap opera producers
American television producers
American soap opera writers
1919 births
1995 deaths
20th-century American businesspeople
20th-century American screenwriters